Bamandongri railway station (station code: BMNDG) is a railway station in Navi Mumbai, Maharashtra. It serves Ulwe Node to Nerul & Belapur. The station consists of two platforms.

The station reopened on 12 November 2018 after construction work.

References

Railway stations in Raigad district
Mumbai CR railway division
Transport in Navi Mumbai
Proposed railway stations in India
Mumbai Suburban Railway stations